Konrad Cordatus or Conrad Cordatus (1480-1546) was a preacher and Protestant reformer in Niemegk who severely attacked Philipp Melanchthon, German reformer and collaborator with Martin Luther, during his sojourn in Tübingen in 1536.

See also 
 List of Protestant Reformers

References

External links 
 http://donschoewe.blogspot.fr/2011/05/2358-to-conrad-cordaus-pastor-in.html

Austrian Lutheran theologians
People of the Protestant Reformation
1480 births
1546 deaths